Val-de-Scie (literally Vale of Scie) is a commune in the Seine-Maritime department in the Normandy region in northern France. It was established on 1 January 2019 by merger of the former communes of Auffay (the seat), Cressy and Sévis.

Population

See also
Communes of the Seine-Maritime department

References

Communes of Seine-Maritime